The Forest, also referred to as Forest Café, was an independent social centre and arts centre located in central Edinburgh, Scotland. It was notable for being run by volunteers as a charitable, self-sustaining not-for-profit. Forest café was initially housed at 3 Bristo Place in the former Edinburgh Seventh Day Adventist Church, a building owned by the Edinburgh University Settlement until August 2011. It featured a café, arts gallery, performance space, rehearsal/music studio, and darkroom specialising in alternative photographic process. In August 2012 the Forest reopened at 141 Lauriston Place, Tollcross where it continued its activity as a volunteer-run vegetarian cafe with regular free events and workshops, assuming a pivotal role in the revival of the independent community development in central Edinburgh. In 2022 the physical space closed citing difficulties arising from the COVID-19 pandemic, despite arts activities continuing decentrally.

Background
The Forest organisation itself started in August 2000 with a venue in West Port, off the Grassmarket in Edinburgh's Old Town. Relocation to the Bristo Place premises started in September 2003 and the Forest Café opened there in October 2003. After leaving in August 2011, the Forest Café reopened again in Tollcross in August 2012.

West Port

Bristo Place

The building at 3 Bristo Place was constructed during 1899–1900 to a design by Sydney Mitchell and Wilson for the Evangelical Union on the site of a former Baptist Chapel.  The category-B listed building has  of floor space and was previously owned by the National Museums of Scotland, who sold the building for £600,000 during 2003.  The plaque over the door reflects its subsequent use as a Seventh-day Adventist Church, who had purchased the building in 1942 and used it until 2000.

Free events were held regularly, including workshops, music, film, poetry, theatre and readings. There was a community darkroom catering to black and white, alternative and historic process photography. During each summer the venue ran the 'August Forest Fringe', a theatre and alternative arts programme as an alternative complement to the mainstream Edinburgh Festival.

In 2004, the Forest Café became one of only four internet cafés in the United Kingdom to have won a highly recommended citation in the Yahoo! Mail Internet Café Awards.

The Edinburgh University Settlement - the charity that owned the Bristo Place building - went bankrupt in October 2010, and it was announced that the premises were to be sold. The Forest launched a campaign to raise £500,000 to try to buy the building, or buy or rent another property elsewhere in Edinburgh.

Pipe organ
The upper floors of the Bristo Place building are the former church, the centre piece of which is a Gray & Davison-built pipe organ. It was originally installed at the Chapel Royal, Dublin Castle in the late 19th century and transferred to its present location in 1900. The organ fell into disrepair until mid-June 2007 when the Debian annual conference—DebConf7—was held in Edinburgh. During the week-long event, sufficient repairs were made by Tore Sinding Bekkedal and others to enable the organ to function again at which point it was played by Keith Packard.

In 2008–2009, Project  (English: "Forest Flute") was initiated, a musical experiment to control sections of the mechanical musical keyboard via an electronic MIDI interface from a computer.  is the designation of one of the organ stops available and was chosen because of the connection of the word "forest".  The argumentation of the keyboards was undertaken by Dorkbot Alba without any long-term modification of the original organ.

Squatting
The old Forest building was squatted on 30 November 2011 by a group of local residents protesting against the closure of several of the city's independent arts spaces including the Forest, though the protest itself was not affiliated to it. The activists stated that they wished to reopen the building to the public. In its new guise, the space played host to several events and affiliate groups before being finally evicted.

Tollcross
The Forest moved to 141 Lauriston Place.

Café
The café served vegetarian cuisine, locally produced organic food, vegan food and Fairtrade drinks. The menu consisted of salads, wraps, chili, burritos, falafel based dishes and soups. Customers were able to pay for hot drinks for others through a Caffè sospeso system which worked on a pay it forward basis, this meant that a customer may pay for a coffee for someone who is unable to afford one themselves. Free Wi-Fi was available for public use, instruments and board games were also provided. There was a free shop where visitors to the café could exchange goods which might otherwise have gone to waste.

Activity
Due to local noise restrictions the café was no longer able to provide late night music or loud entertainment, however during the daytime the café was often host to free performances by local musicians, poets or artists. All events were always free of charge and were never ticketed. The renovated basement was home to a pop-up art gallery space which rotated exhibitions on a twice monthly basis.

Community
The Forest maintained close relationships with other alternative community spaces and socially oriented projects in the local area such as the Edinburgh Student Housing Co-operative, and the Swap and Reuse Hub (SHRUB).

References

External links
Official website
https://www.flickr.com/photos/forest_darkroom
WaldFlöte organ automation
Forest Fringe
STV - Forest Cafe Moves to Tollcross

Coffeehouses and cafés in the United Kingdom
Culture in Edinburgh
Social centres in the United Kingdom
Tourist attractions in Edinburgh
Internet cafés
Evicted squats
Squats in the United Kingdom
Squatting in Scotland
Infoshops